Homophonic translation renders a text in one language into a near-homophonic text in another language, usually with no attempt to preserve the original meaning of the text.  In one homophonic translation, for example, the English "sat on a wall"  is rendered as French ""  (literally "gets surprised at the Paris Market"). More generally, homophonic transformation renders a text into a near-homophonic text in the same or another language: e.g., "recognize speech" could become "wreck a nice beach".

Homophonic translation is generally used humorously, as bilingual punning (macaronic language). This requires the listener or reader to understand both the surface, nonsensical translated text, as well as the source text—the surface text then sounds like source text spoken in a foreign accent.

Homophonic translation may be used to render proper nouns in a foreign language. If an attempt is made to match meaning as well as sound, it is phono-semantic matching.

Examples 

Frayer Jerker is a homophonic translation of the French Frère Jacques (1956). Other examples of homophonic translation include some works by Oulipo (1960–), Frédéric Dard, Luis van Rooten's English-French Mots D'Heures: Gousses, Rames (1967), Louis Zukofsky's Latin-English Catullus Fragmenta (1969), Ormonde de Kay's English-French N'Heures Souris Rames (1980), John Hulme's German-English Morder Guss Reims: The Gustav Leberwurst Manuscript, and David Melnick's Ancient Greek-English Men in Aida (1983).

An example of homophonic transformation in the same language is Howard L. Chace's "Ladle Rat Rotten Hut", written in "Anguish Languish" (English Language) and published in book form in 1956.

A British schoolboy example of Dog Latin:

Other names proposed for this genre include "allographic translation", "transphonation", or (in French) "traducson", but none of these is widely used.

Here is van Rooten's version of Humpty Dumpty:

The individual words are all correct French. (*fallent is an obsolete form of the verb falloir; Reguennes is an invented proper name), and some passages follow standard syntax and are interpretable (though nonsensical), but the result is in fact not meaningful French.

The Italian rabbi Leon of Modena composed at age 13 an octave by the name of "Kinah Sh'mor", meaningful in both Hebrew and Renaissance Judeo-Italian, as an elegy for his teacher Moses della Rocca. The first four verses are below.

Ghil'ad Zuckermann's "Italo-Hebraic Homophonous Poem" is meaningful in both Italian and Hebrew, "although it has a surreal, evocative flavour, and modernist style".

Here is another example of a sentence which has two completely different meanings if read in Latin or in Italian:

Mondegreen 

Homophonic translations of song lyrics, often combined with music videos, for comic effect—also known as mondegreen—have gained popularity on the internet.

Soramimi 

Homophonic translation and reinterpretation for humor is known as soramimi in Japan. Unlike Homophonic translation, it can be applied to the same language, and unlike mondegreen, it is not confined to song lyrics.

See also 
 
 Holorime, a form of rhyme where the entire line or phrase is repeated by a homophonic variant
 Mairzy Doats
 Mondegreen, the erroneous interpretation of language by homophony
 Mots d'Heures
 Phono-semantic matching (PSM), a borrowing in which a foreign word is matched with a phonetically and semantically similar pre-existent native word/root.
 Soramimi homophonic reinterpretation for humor
 Translation

References